Rawat is a village and union council of Murree Tehsil in the Murree District of Punjab, Pakistan. It is located in the north of the country in the hilly part of Punjab province, near to the border with North-West Frontier Province and Kashmir. The tourist resort of Bhurban is located here.

See also
Rawat Fort
Riwat

References

Union councils of Murree Tehsil
Populated places in Murree Tehsil
Murree